Buca Arena is a football stadium in Izmir and is located near to Yedigöller, north of Buca. Construction began in 2008; the opening ceremony of the new stadium was in 2009. The official capacity of Buca Arena is 8,810. Near the stadium, a carpet area, two basketball courts, jogging paths and a 300 car parking lot are located.

Bucaspor played its first official match at the stadium against Çorumspor on 18 January 2009.

References

External links
Venue information

Football venues in Turkey
Bucaspor
Sports venues in İzmir
Süper Lig venues
Sports venues completed in 2009